John Alexander Catherwood (October 26, 1857 – December 21, 1940) was a fruit grower, bee keeper and political figure in British Columbia. He represented Dewdney from 1920 to 1928 in the Legislative Assembly of British Columbia as a Conservative.

He was born in Bolton Village, Ontario in 1857, the son of Thomas Catherwood and Ann Abercrombie, and was educated in Caledonia. In 1886, Catherwood married Edith Margaret Solloway. He was reeve of Mission, British Columbia for 17 years. Catherwood was unseated in February 1925 by a decision of the B.C. Supreme Court after a recount reduced his majority in the election to 5; he was reinstated in June 1925. He died in Mission City at the age of 83 in 1940.

References 

1857 births
1940 deaths
British Columbia Conservative Party MLAs